The Labia Theatre is one of the oldest independent movie theatres in Cape Town, South Africa.

History
The original building was an Italian Embassy ballroom opened by Princess Labia on 16 May 1949 as a theatre for the staging of live performance arts. Films were screened during the periods when no live performances were presented.

In the early 70s a group of young film enthusiasts turned the venue into a full-time cinema screening arthouse films. The venture was a great success. Eric Liknaitzky and Trevor Taylor were the chief programmers during this period.

When Ludi Kraus took over in September 1989, the Labia continued to mainly screen cult, classic and art movies, but included more commercial fare too. Much of the original features of the old building have been maintained, such as the ticket booth, sweets counter, and even the seats.

Changes to the theatre, since its inception, have included three more cinemas, a bar and food area, and a terrace. For several years, there was an annex location with two modern screens in the Lifestyle Centre at 50 Kloof Street, but this location was closed in 2013.

Crowdfunding
In July 2014, the Labia Theatre started a crowdfunding campaign called "Digital Gold." This initiative was to raise funds for digital projectors, new facilities, and an upgraded foyer. The initiative was sufficiently successful, with 885 individuals raising over R550,000. Although well short of the R2,000,000 target needed, the campaign helped rejuvenate the Labia Theatre with digital projectors in all of its cinemas.

Controversy
In February 2012, the Palestine Solidarity Campaign (PSC) threatened to boycott the theatre and lodge a complaint with the Human Rights Commission (HRC) after it refused to screen the documentary Roadmap to Apartheid, which draws parellels between South African apartheid and the Israeli–Palestinian conflict, due to its politically controversial nature and what appeared to the theatre's owner to be one-sidedness; the PSC alleged, however, that this was due to local Zionist lobbying, and Right2Know, who were hosting the free screening in association with the Labia and the PSC, accused the Labia of "succumb[ing] to pressure from the Zionist Federation".

References

External links
 I ♥ the Labia – a short film made in support of the theatre's crowdfunding effort

Buildings and structures in Cape Town
Cape Town culture
Repertory cinemas
Cinemas in South Africa